Fang Island is the debut self-titled studio album by indie rock band Fang Island. It was released in 2010 on Sargent House. The album received favorable reviews from critics, with Pitchfork listing it under 'best new music'.

Track listing
 "Dreams of Dreams" - 1:57
 "Careful Crossers" - 2:51
 "Daisy" - 3:19
 "Life Coach" - 2:57
 "Sideswiper" - 4:13
 "The Illinois" - 2:27
 "Treeton" - 3:28
 "Davey Crockett" - 5:47
 "Welcome Wagon" - 2:49
 "Dorian" - 1:39

References

2010 albums
Fang Island albums
Sargent House albums